Raimondo Inconis (born Mars 27, 1959 in San Gavino Monreale, Sardinia) is an Italian bassoonist, contrabassoonist and Professor of Bassoon. He is widely regarded as one of the preeminent contrabassoon players and  pedagogues of the 20th and early-21st centuries.

Early life
Inconis was born in San Gavino Monreale, Italy. He began playing the piano at the age of seven, and shortly afterwards took up the bassoon, studying with Orlando Pittau, at the Cagliari Conservatory, where he graduated with highest honors.

Career
Estimated and appreciated like tireless and scrupulous investigator of sources biographical and historians of the contrabassoon, there has been employed in 1994 for the publishing house Ricordi of Milan at the achievement of the book: "Il Controfagotto, Storia e Tecnica (The Contrabassoon, history and technique)" – ER 3008 / ISMN 979-0-041-83008-7. Considered most authoritative guide to the technical-expressive fundamentals of the contrabassoon.

References

External links 
  Fondazione Orchestra Sinfonica Siciliana
 Importants Contrebassonistes
 Académie Internationale d'Eté, Nice
 Teatro Lirico di Cagliari
 Nenad Firšt – Pezzo Rusticano per fagotto Solo

1959 births
Italian classical bassoonists
Living people